The Jazz Theory Book is an influential work by Mark Levine, first published in 1995. The book is a staple in jazz theory, and contains a wide range of jazz concepts from melodic minor scales and whole tone scale to bebop scales, diminished scales and "Coltrane" reharmonization. Levine assumes that the reader can read music, and gives over 750 musical examples.

See also
The Jazz Piano Book

References

Jazz books
1995 non-fiction books
Music textbooks